Elkhan Mammadov may refer to:

 Elkhan Mammadov (judoka) (born in 1982), is a retired Azerbaijani judoka
 Elkhan Mammadov (fencer) (born in 1969), He competed in the individual sabre event at the 1996 Summer Olympics
 Elkhan Mammadov (official) (born in 1979), General Secretary of Association of Football Federations of Azerbaijan